J. S. M. Hooper was the first General Secretary of the Bible Society of India on its creation on 1 November 1944. Hooper was also involved in translations of the Bible Society of India.

Contribution
Archana Venkatesan, Associate Professor of Religious Studies and Comparative Literature at the University of California, Berkeley in an English version of Nammalwar's A Hundred Measures of Time: Tiruviruttam has referred to a publication of J. S. M. Hooper in 1929 titled Hymns of the Alvars and has devoted a lengthy footnote on the life and times of Hooper, especially the period when he came to India, his contribution to the ecumenical efforts resulting in the formation of the Church of South India and to the Bible Society of India.  Archana also writes that Hooper worked closely with Lesslie Newbigin and V. S. Azariah, both of whom were pioneers in the ecumenical efforts towards the formation of the Church of South India.

Education
After taking B. A. and M. A. degrees at Corpus Christi College, Oxford, Hooper came to India in 1905 and stayed in Chennai serving as a Pastor of the Wesleyan Methodist Church. In 1930, Hooper served as Headmaster of the Wesley High School.

Ecumenism
As a Wesleyan, Hooper was involved in the negotiations with the Anglicans and other Protestant congregations towards working forward towards ecumenism which ultimately resulted in the formation of the Church of South India in 1947 at the St. George's Cathedral, Chennai.

Translations of the Bible into the languages of India
Hooper became the first General Secretary of the British and Foreign Bible Society in India in 1932 and continued till 1944. When the Bible Society of India was formed on 1 November 1944, Hooper became the first general secretary and held the position from 1944 until 1947.

Writings
 1918, The approach to the Gospel : addresses delivered to the Annual Conference of the American Presbyterian Mission of Western India at Panhala, Kolhapur, 
 1920, The approach to the Gospel,
 1929, Hymns of the Āl̤vars,
 1938, The Bible in India : with a chapter on Ceylon (republished in 1963),
 1944, Life eternal : addresses delivered at the Kodaikanal missionary convention,
 1947, A Call to Prayer to the Uniting Churches in South India
 1948, The temptation and the establishment of the kingdom of God,
 1957, Greek New Testament terms in Indian languages : a comparative word list,
 1963, Bible translation in India, Pakistan and Ceylon (original version published in 1938; Revised by W. J. Culshaw),
 1963, The story of Methodism in Stratford-upon-Avon,

Recognition
The Emperor of India awarded the medal of Kaisar-i-Hind Medal in 1938 to Hooper for his meritorious service with the British and Foreign Bible Society in India.  Nearly two decades later, the nation's first University, the Senate of Serampore College, West Bengal, conferred a Doctor of Divinity (honoris causa) upon Hooper in 1957.

Archives 
A collection of archival material related to Rev J. M. Sterling Hooper can be found at the Cadbury Research Library, University of Birmingham.

References
Notes

Further reading
 

Alumni of Corpus Christi College, Oxford
Academic staff of the Senate of Serampore College (University)
British Christian theologians
20th-century British people
British Methodists
Recipients of the Kaisar-i-Hind Medal
British emigrants to India